Hitori (Alone) is Jun Shibata's third studio album. It was released on 25 February 2004 and peaked at No. 15 in Japan.

Track listing
Shoujo (少女; Girl)
Niji (虹; Rainbow)
Miseinen (未成年; Underage)
Ashiato~Piano Solo~ (足跡～Piano Solo～; Footsteps: Piano Solo)
Anata to no hibi (あなたとの日々; The Days with You)
Kanawanai (かなわない; Impossible)
Yuuhi~Piano Solo~ (夕日～Piano Solo～; Sunset: Piano Solo)
Yuki no oto (雪の音; The Sound of Snow)
Konbini (コンビニ; Convenience Store)
Kon'ya, kimi no koe ga kikitai (今夜、君の声が聞きたい; Tonight, I want to Hear Your Voice)
Hitori aruki (ひとり歩き; Walking Alone)

Charts

External links
https://web.archive.org/web/20161030094458/http://www.shibatajun.com/— Shibata Jun Official Website

2004 albums
Jun Shibata albums